June Pictures was an American independent entertainment production company founded by Alex Saks and Andrew Duncan, and based in Los Angeles, California. It specialized in film production, and film finance.

The company has produced films such as Thoroughbreds, Dude, Wildlife, and Book Club. In 2017, their production The Florida Project received a Best Supporting Actor nomination.

History
In February 2016, it was announced Alex Saks and Andrew Duncan would launch the company, focusing on producing and financing feature films and documentaries, with Dude, being the first film produced by the company. The company will finance films ranging from $5–10 million. The company has produced films such as Thoroughbreds directed by Cory Finley, Fun Mom Dinner, by Alethea Jones, Wildlife, by Paul Dano, Book Club by Bill Holderman, and The Florida Project by Sean Baker.

In December 2017, Duncan was accused of sexual misconduct by over a dozen people. Following the allegations, Duncan stepped down from the company. Saks bought out Duncan's shares in the company stating: "In light of allegations of misconduct against our investor Andrew Duncan, I am assuming sole ownership and leadership of June Pictures. June Pictures is committed to a respectful work environment dedicated to producing quality films. We will continue our projects already in production and development." That same year, the company shut down.

Filmography

References

External links
 

Film production companies of the United States
Companies based in Los Angeles
Mass media companies established in 2016
2016 establishments in California
2018 disestablishments in California
Mass media companies disestablished in 2018
Defunct film and television production companies of the United States